José Manuel Beirán Lozano (born 7 February 1956) is a former Spanish basketball player with Real Madrid Baloncesto of the Liga ACB. He was born in León. He also played for Spain at the 1984 Summer Olympics, where he scored 8 points in 4 appearances. Spain won a silver medal in the games.

Personal life
His son Javier is also a professional basketball player.

References

1956 births
Living people
Basketball players at the 1984 Summer Olympics
CB Valladolid players
Liga ACB players
Medalists at the 1984 Summer Olympics
Olympic basketball players of Spain
Olympic medalists in basketball
Olympic silver medalists for Spain
Sportspeople from León, Spain
Real Madrid Baloncesto players
Spanish men's basketball players
Tenerife AB players
Small forwards